Illya Chichkan (born 29 August 1967 in Kiev, Ukraine) is a representative of the art movement "Ukrainian New Wave", which developed in the 1990s. He is a third generation artist. He lives and works in Berlin, Germany, and Kyiv, Ukraine, as a painter, author of installations, photo and video-projects.

In 2014, Chichkan along with his wife Masha Shubina, had visited India, a trip of which he was dreaming since childhood. There, during winter season, he paints his paintings.

Ilya Chichkan have a daughter, Sasha, a co-author of Psychodarwinism. In a dialogue Marat Gelman  with Kostyantyn Doroshenko they expressed interesting thoughts about the exhibition New «Psychodarwinism». The Ukrainian artist took it as a basis famous paintings of the Tretyakov Gallery  grotesquely depicting the main characters in the form of monkeys. Analyzing the artist's blasphemous gesture Doroshenko remarked: "Imperial totalitarian society puts art on a pedestal as something that rises above life and directs it… « Psychodarwinism» - a proposal to abandon elitism and hierarchies.».

Family 
Illya Chichkan's father, Arkadii Chychkan, was a Ukrainian nonconformist artist, he participated in "The exhibition of 13" (1979), a prominent manifestation of Ukrainian painters' passive resistance against social realism. Illya Chychkan's children, David and Oleksandra, are also known as young contemporary Ukrainian artists.

Literature
Perscha Kollektija Exhibition Catalogue, Kyiv, 2003
From Red to Yellow to Blue, Ludmila Bereznitsky, Kyiv, 2004
 Illya & Sasha Chichkan. PsychoDarwinism. Back to the Roods : exhibition catalogue 23.11–14.12.2017. Kyiv : [Golden Section], 2017. 46 p. 
  Conversation Marat Gelman with an art critic. New "Psychodarwinism" by Ilya Chichkan.Zima magazine.17.02.2021

References

External links

werkstadt.mur.at
taz.de
paetau.com

1967 births
Living people
Artists from Kyiv